Anuga FoodTec (official subtitle: "International Supplier Fair for the Food and Beverage Industry") is a trade fair for the food and beverage industry. It covers aspects of food production including process technology, filling and packaging technology, packaging materials, ingredients and food safety, and food production. It is structured into eight product segments: food processing, food packaging, safety and analytics, digitalisation, automation, intralogistics, environment and energy, science and pioneering.

The fair takes place every three years in Cologne. The event is organised by Koelnmesse, and is sponsored by the Deutsche Landwirtschafts-Gesellschaft e.V. (German Agricultural Society).

History 
Originating from the former Anuga-Technica and DLG-FoodTec, Anuga FoodTec has been providing an overview of food production technologies since 1996. Since 2011, Koelnmesse has maintained a strategic partnership for Anuga FoodTec with the "Packaging Machinery Manufacturers Institute" (PMMI), USA (the organiser of Pack Expo and Expo Pack). In April 2016, Koelnmesse entered into a cooperation with Fiere di Parma to jointly organise the Cibus Tec food technology in Parma in the future.

In 2012, it had 42,986 visitors (from 126 countries) and 1,289 exhibitors (from 41 countries), and was conducted on a gross area of 127,000 m². In 2012, exhibitors increased by over 10% and visitors increased over 27%. In 2015, it had 1,479 exhibitors (from 49 countries) - an increase of 15 percent, a gross area of 129,700 m² and 45,604 visitors (from 139 countries) - an increase of 6 percent. Over 54 per cent of visitors came from abroad.

In 2018, 1,657 exhibitors and over 50,000 visitors (from 152 countries) came to the fair.

In 2021, the trade show had to be postponed to April 2022 due to the COVID-19 pandemic.

At the unscheduled special edition in 2022, the physical trade show will be complemented by the digital extension Anuga FoodTec@home.
 
The 2022 Anuga FoodTec is planned to take place from April 26 to 29, 2022.

Services 
The Anuga FoodTec provides an overview of the technologies of the manufacturing and packaging process in the production of food and drink. It is arranged in separate segments like:

 Process technology
 Filling and packaging technology
 Automation, software and control equipment
 Laboratory technology, analytics, biotechnology and quality equipment
 Operation materials and environmental technology
 Refrigeration and air-conditioning technology
 Conveying, transport and storage facilities, logistics and intralogistics
 Ingredients and auxiliary materials
 Components, assemblies, surface technology and accessories
 Service firms, organisations and publishers
 Packaging materials, packaging and packaging aids

References

Further reading 
 Record Result: Anuga FoodTec 2018 Achieves Significant Increase in Attendance
 Shaun Weston reports from Anuga FoodTec 2012 in Cologne, Germany.
 Anuga FoodTec at bestinpackaging
 Anuga FoodTec at Dairyfoods
 Anuga FoodTec at Lebensmittel Technik
 Anuga Foodtec postponed
 Discover the digital platform of Anuga FoodTec @home

External links 
 Anuga FoodTec
 German Agricultural Society - DLG
 Koelnmesse

Trade fairs in Germany
Economy of Cologne